Dorothy Ann Rabb Brown Cook, also known as 
Dorothy Brown (born September 4, 1953) is an American lawyer and politician associated with the Democratic Party who served as the clerk of the Circuit Court of Cook County from 2000 through 2020.

She was an unsuccessful candidate for mayor of Chicago in the 2007 and 2019 elections, an unsuccessful candidate for Chicago city clerk in 1999, and an unsuccessful candidate for president of the Cook County Board of Commissioners in 2010.

Early life, family, and education 
Brown grew up in Minden, Louisiana, one of eight children. Her father worked in the laundry room of the Louisiana Army Ammunitions Plant near Minden. He also owned a cotton farm in Athens, Louisiana, where Brown and her seven siblings helped him pick and chop cotton. Brown's mother worked as a cook and a domestic.

At Webster High School, Brown was captain of the girl's varsity basketball team, and graduated in the top ten percent of her class.  Brown studied at Southern University in Baton Rouge, Louisiana and graduated magna cum laude. In 1977, Brown received her license as a Certified Public Accountant (CPA). In 1981, she received her Master of Business Administration (MBA) with honors from DePaul University in Chicago. In 1996, Brown received her J.D. degree with honors from Chicago-Kent College of Law.

Professional career 
Brown worked for Arthur Andersen and Commonwealth Edison as a certified public accountant.  She also helped to start a minority public accounting firm. From 1991 to 2000, Brown worked as the general auditor for the Chicago Transit Authority (CTA).

Brown unsuccessfully ran for Treasurer of the City of Chicago in 1999, losing to incumbent Miriam Santos by a 2.8% margin.

Clerk of the Circuit Court of Cook County (2000–2020)

Cook County voters elected Brown as the Clerk of the Circuit Court in 2000, and reelected her four additional times. Brown served for 20 years and retired in 2020. As the official keeper of records for all judicial matters brought into one of the largest unified court systems in the world, Brown was responsible for managing an annual operating budget of more than $100 million and had a workforce of over 1,800 employees. In 2014 the Chicago Sun-Times described the Clerk's office as "a 2,300-employee office, one of the last true bastions of political patronage in Illinois".

Major projects and services developed under Brown's leadership include: Two Electronic filing (e-filing), a Clerk of the Circuit Court mobile app:  "Court Clerk Mobile Connect," an Online Traffic Ticket Payment System, an Electronic Tickets (eTickets) system, Mortgage Surplus Search, SmartForms (Online Order of Protection service), Smart Kiosks (court information terminals), and IDMS (Imaging Document Management System).

In 2012, during Brown's third reelection campaign, the Chicago Tribune editorial board declined to endorse any candidate, citing "Brown's years of failed assurances to modernize the obsolete, paper-choked office she heads."

In August 2015, the slating committee of the Cook County Democratic Party narrowly voted to endorse Brown for reelection to a fifth term in the March 2016 primary elections. In early October 2015, the Federal Bureau of Investigation executed a search warrant at Brown's home and seized her County-issued cell phone. Chicago attorney Ed Genson represented Brown. On October 23, 2015 the Cook County Democratic Party withdrew its endorsement of Brown, and endorsed Michelle A. Harris.

Both the Chicago Sun-Times and Chicago Tribune declined to endorse Brown or her opponent in the 2016 campaign. Brown went on to win both the Democratic primary and the general election, being reelected for a fifth term.

Beginning in August 2018, a federally-ordered monitor was appointed under to audit the hiring and employment practices of Brown's office in an effort to monitor the office's compliance with the Shakman Decrees. This federal oversight of the office's hiring and employment practices would not cease until November 2022, during the tenure of Brown's successor.

In August 2019, Brown announced that she would not seek reelection to a sixth term in 2020.

Ethics, criticisms and controversies
Brown accepted cash gifts on her birthday and Christmas from her employees. In 2008 Brown announced that she would no longer accept the gifts after questions arose regarding how she claimed the items.

In May 2006, Brown chaired the host committee for a Chicago fund raiser to support the reelection of Mayor Ray Nagin of New Orleans, Louisiana. Information technology contractor Mark St. Pierre, who had worked contracts for both the city of New Orleans and Cook County government and contributed to both Brown and Nagin's political campaigns, organized the event. Nagin was indicted on corruption charges on January 18, 2013, with the fundraiser being cited in the indictment. He was convicted in 2014.

In January 2010, the Inspector General of Cook County investigated Brown's "Jeans Day" program, in which Clerk's office employees could donate cash to the Jeans Day fund and wear casual clothing to work on a Friday. The Jeans Day fund, which grew to over $300,000, was supposed to be used to fund employee morale activities and charities. The Inspector General's report documented expenditures unrelated to charitable causes, including Chicago Bulls tickets, Six Flags Great America tickets, and employee parking reimbursements. The Inspector General's report cleared Brown's office of wrongdoing, but advised Brown provide better controls. Brown discontinued Jeans Day in August 2010.

In June 2011, a contributor to Brown's political campaigns gave a commercial property at the intersection of Pulaski, Ogden and Cermak Avenues on Chicago's southwest side to Brown's husband. Two months later, the deed was transferred to The Sankofa Group, L. L. C., Brown and her husband's for-profit consulting firm, and in November 2011 The Sankofa Group sold the property for $100,000. The Cook County Inspector General and by a grand jury convened by prosecutors with the Cook County State's Attorney's office opened an investigation of the land deal.

In 2013, it was reported that a campaign donor had given Brown's husband a parcel of land for $1. Brown's name was later added to paperwork and Sankofa Group (a private entity once registered to Brown's home) ended up on the title. Brown and her husband sold the land for $100,000. Brown did not disclose the land as a gift or donation on state economic interest forms.

In November 2015, a federal indictment alleged that a clerk's office employee had been rehired by the Clerk's office weeks after lending $15,000 to a company controlled by Brown's husband, then lied to a federal grand jury about the incident. The employee pleaded guilty in 2016, and the "going rate" for a job in the office may have been $10,000.

In 2018, a federal probe detailed accounts of alleged job-buying in Brown's office.

In March 2019, a federal indictment charged Donald Danagher with bribery, alleging a pay-for-contract scheme which involved making donations to Brown's campaign and scholarship funds in exchange for his debt collection business receiving a contract.

On April 26, 2019, a jury convicted former Brown aide Beena Patel, who had supervised approximately 500 employees in the clerk's office, of perjury concerning her federal grand jury testimony in 2015 and 2016. In November 2019, court documents evidenced that Patels perjury had protected Brown against prosecution.

In late 2019, Brown's office had a class-action lawsuit brought against it alleging that it had charged illegal fees to people seeking child support enforcement.

In October 2021, Donald Donagher Jr., the former CEO of a debt-collection company, admitted in federal court that he had made payments to support a Women's History Month program run by Brown in an effort to reward brown for business he believed she had directed to him.

For much of her tenure, Brown has been criticized for failing to provide stored records that had been requested in a timely fashion.

Brown has been criticized by advocacy groups for her failure to sufficiently update the court system. The court's case management system has been characterized as "archaic". A partial update, first phased-in in November 2019, which digitized criminal courts filings, proved problematic. This update led to records it made available being often incomplete, and taking longer to be updated. This proved so problematic that the court itself in October 2020 ordered that Brown halt its implementation.

Amid the COVID-19 pandemic, Brown received criticism from courts clerks and the clerks' union, who argued she was not doing enough to protect them and the public amid the pandemic. Some clerks walked off the job. She also had Legal Aid Chicago file a lawsuit against her in June 2020 accusing her office, during the pandemic, failing to provide domestic violence and sexual assault survivors with copies of their orders of protection immediately after they had been granted, which the office had a statutory duty to do. The lawsuit by Legal Aid Chicago further accused Brown's office of failing to transmit such orders top the Cook County Sheriff's Office in a timely fashion so that they could be entered into that office's Law Enforcement Agency Data System. The lawsuit argued that these alleged failures on the part of Brown's office endangered survivors of domestic violence and sexual assault. Also during the pandemic, Brown received criticism for failure to mail out the notices telling individuals that their court appearances would be conducted virtually in a timely fashion, with some notices having been mailed out after the date of the court appearances had already passed. When questioned by WGN-TV on this, Brown alleged that “unconscious racism” was at the root of both that story, and other negative stories reported on her during her tenure. In November 2020, Brown was caught by WGN-TV holding a retirement party that appeared to possibly violate the city and state's 50-person limit on gatherings amid the pandemic.

Pursuits of other office during tenure as clerk
Brown unsuccessfully ran mayor of Chicago in 2007. She was the only established political figure challenging incumbent mayor Richard M. Daley. Brown failed to attract strong enough support from the African American community to mount a true challenge to Daley, and lagged severely behind Daley in terms of campaign funds. She ultimately finished in second place out of three candidates, with 20.12% of the vote, 51 points behind Daley.

Brown ran for president of the Cook County Board of Commissioners in 2010. At one point, she led the Democratic field in at Chicago Tribune poll. However, she ultimately lost the Democratic primary to Toni Preckwinkle, placing third out of four candidates, behind Preckwinkle and Terrence J. O'Brien. Brown received 14.45% of the vote.

Despite the scandals she had faced, Brown attempted to run for mayor of Chicago in 2019, but was removed from the ballot for failing to complete the required paperwork. Following her removal from the ballot, Brown endorsed Amara Enyia for mayor. However, Enyia failed to qualify for the runoff election, which was won by Lori Lightfoot.

Activities after leaving office
After her successor as clerk of the Circuit Court of Cook County, Iris Martinez, was critical of the shape of the office she inherited from Brown, on December 17, 2020, Brown released a three-page statement to WGN-TV which was highly critical of Martinez. Brown accused Martinez of refusing attempts she had made to assist Martinez's transition into office. Brown wrote that Martinez, "obviously does not have a plan or a clue how to run the office." Brown's statement also included comments which attacked Martinez for hiring Puerto Rican individuals to management, writing, "Iris Martinez's administration does not look the racial make-up of Cook County, but it looks like Puerto Rico". The statement also accused Martinez and her staff of, "showing disrespect to the American English language, and the English-speaking staff, by only communicating in Spanish, when non-Spanish speaking staff are present."

In 2021, Brown led the transition team of Tiffany Heynard after Heynard was elected mayor of Dolton, Illinois. From October 2021 until December 31, 2021, Brown served as village administrator of Dolton, having been appointed by Heynard, who considers Brown to be her mentor. The hiring of Brown to the six-figure position sparked criticism from several Dolton city trustees.

Honors
In 2013, Brown was an honoree awarded at the "125 Alumni of Distinction Reception" held by the Chicago-Kent College of Law. In 2021, Brown was inducted into Southern University's Black College Alumni Hall of Fame. She has received professional achievement awards from both of these alma maters. Other honors that Brown has received include the Marks of Excellence Award from the National Forum for Black Public Administrators, the Women of Achievement Award from the Anti-Defamation League, and the Justinian Society of Lawyers Humanitarian Award.

Electoral history

Publications

References

External links
Clerk of the Circuit Court of Cook County
Illinois Circuit Court Clerks by District & Circuit
Dorothy Brown news and investigations by the Better Government Association, an Illinois watchdog group
Dorothy Brown archive at the Chicago Reader

Lawyers from Chicago
Living people
Politicians from Chicago
DePaul University alumni
Chicago-Kent College of Law alumni
1953 births
People from Minden, Louisiana
People from Athens, Louisiana
Clerks of the Circuit Court of Cook County
Illinois Democrats